West Peoria is a city in Peoria County, Illinois, United States. The population was 4,458 at the 2010 census. West Peoria is a suburb of Peoria and is part of the Peoria, Illinois Metropolitan Statistical Area.

Geography
West Peoria is located at  (40.697104, -89.630998).

West Peoria is home to many geographical landmarks such as Rocky Glen, which is a series of abandoned mines.

Demographics

As of the census of 2000, there were 4,762 people, 1,984 households, and 1,222 families residing in the city. The racial makeup of the city was 88.09% White, 8.53% African American, 0.19% Native American, 0.86% Asian, 0.73% from other races, and 1.60% from two or more races. Hispanic or Latino of any race were 1.39% of the population.

There were 1,984 households, out of which 25.7% had children under the age of 18 living with them, 47.8% were married couples living together, 10.5% had a female householder with no husband present, and 38.4% were non-families. 32.1% of all households were made up of individuals, and 12.9% had someone living alone who was 65 years of age or older. The average household size was 2.29 and the average family size was 2.89.

In the city, the population was spread out, with 21.9% under the age of 18, 7.8% from 18 to 24, 27.8% from 25 to 44, 22.7% from 45 to 64, and 19.8% who were 65 years of age or older. The median age was 40 years. For every 100 females, there were 86.3 males. For every 100 females age 18 and over, there were 82.5 males.

The median income for a household in the city was $41,148, and the median income for a family was $51,420. Males had a median income of $36,130 versus $28,519 for females. The per capita income for the city was $22,247. About 5.0% of families and 8.1% of the population were below the poverty line, including 13.2% of those under age 18 and 6.6% of those age 65 or over.

References

External links
West Peoria Municipal Website

Cities in Illinois
Cities in Peoria County, Illinois
Former census-designated places in Illinois
Peoria metropolitan area, Illinois
Populated places established in 1993
1993 establishments in Illinois